WXCC (96.5 FM, "Coal Country 96.5") is a radio station licensed to serve Williamson, West Virginia. The station is owned by Lynn Parrish, through licensee Mountain Top Media LLC. It airs a country music format. WXCC is an affiliate of Fox News Radio.

History
The first song played on WXCC, broadcasting in the heart of West Virginia's coal country, was Tennessee Ernie Ford's "Sixteen Tons".  The station was assigned the WXCC call letters by the Federal Communications Commission.

References

External links
WXCC official website

XCC
Radio stations established in 1978
XCC
Mingo County, West Virginia